Museum of Human Beings is a novel written by Colin Sargent, which delves into the life of Jean Baptiste Charbonneau, the son of Sacagawea.  Sacagawea was the Native American guide, who at 16 led the Lewis and Clark expedition.

Summary

At the turn of the nineteenth century, the young Indian woman Sacagawea leads Lewis and Clark to the Pacific. But what about that tiny infant in the commemorative engraving, perched on Sacagawea's back? He is her son, Jean Baptiste Charbonneau, the youngest member of the Expedition, a child caught between two worlds who grows into a man haunted by the mother he barely knew and the wilderness she betrayed.
Sacagawea is only sixteen when she leads the Expedition and catches the eye of William Clark who finds her exotically appealing. Afterwards, Clark takes in Sacagawea and her child, and raises Baptiste as a foster son. When the teenage Baptiste attracts the notice of the visiting Duke Paul, Prince of Wurttemberg, Clark approves of the duke's “experiment” to educate the boy at court. A gleeful Duke Paul exhibits Baptiste throughout Europe as a “half gentleman-half animal.” Eventually Jean Baptiste turns his back on the Old World and returns to the New, determined to find his true place there. He travels deep into the heart of the American wilderness, and into the depths of his mother's soul, on an epic quest for identity that brings sacrifice, loss, and the distant promise of redemption.

Reviews

According to Publishers Weekly:

Meanwhile, Andi Deihn makes note of how the author's "sophisticated use of language permeates this tale."  Melody Ballard reviewing for Library Journal comments, "This memorable novel will captivate all who read it."

Notes

The expedition papoose Charbonneau appears on the front of the Sacagawea gold one-dollar coin (2000 to 2008) and remains in circulation in the United States today.

The author participated in a public reading at the Smithsonian's National Museum of the American Indian in December 2008 as part of the "Views From the Field" series dedicated to authors who write about Native American history and issues.

Duke Paul of Wurttemberg's journal Erste Reise nach dem nordlichen Amerika in den Jahren 1822-1824, translated by W. Robert Nitske and edited by Savoie Lottinville as Travels in North America, 1822-1824, includes individual entries documenting the botanist nobleman's taking the precocious young Charbonneau, whom Clark had adopted and educated in St Louis, to Germany with him with the promise of further education, departing New Orleans aboard the brig Smyrna in January 1824. Adept at languages including Mandan, French, Latin, English, German, and Spanish, the young Charbonneau spent over five years at court. In the novel, young Baptiste travels across the Levant with Duke Paul and the prince's painting companion Vogelweide, and performs piano in the presence of Beethoven.

The Museum of Human Beings in the title alludes to the notorious museum that General William Clark built beside his home in St Louis after he returned from the Lewis and Clark Expedition. Inside, Clark kept relics and specimens related to his various American Indian affairs.

Further reading

References

External links
 - Collected reviews on the author's website

2008 novels
Historical novels
Museums in popular culture
Fictional museums